Martin "Murty" Kennedy (born 1956) is an Irish former hurler who played as a midfielder for the Kilkenny senior team.

Born in Freshford, County Kilkenny, Kennedy first played competitive hurling during his schooling at Johnstown Vocational School. He arrived on the inter-county scene at the age of sixteen when he first linked up with the Kilkenny minor team before later joining the under-21 side. He made his senior debut during the 1978 championship. Kennedy subsequently became a regular member of the team and won one Leinster medal.

At club level Kennedy is a one-time championship medallist in the intermediate grade with St Lachtain's.

Throughout his career Kennedy made 6 championship appearances. His retirement came following the conclusion of the 1980 championship.

In retirement from playing Kennedy became involved in team management and coaching. He was a selector with the Kilkenny under-21 team that won the All-Ireland title in 1999.

Honours

Player

Kilkenny Schools
All-Ireland Vocational Schools Championship (2): 1972, 1973

St Lachtain's
Kilkenny Intermediate Hurling Championship (1): 1984

Kilkenny
All-Ireland Senior Hurling Championship (1): 1979 (sub)
Leinster Senior Hurling Championship (2): 1978, 1979 (sub)
All-Ireland Under-21 Hurling Championship (1): 1977
Leinster Under-21 Hurling Championship (2): 1976, 1977
All-Ireland Minor Hurling Championship (1): 1973
Leinster Minor Hurling Championship (2): 1973, 1974

Selector

Kilkenny
All-Ireland Under-21 Hurling Championship (1): 1999
Leinster Under-21 Hurling Championship (1): 1999

References

1956 births
Living people
Irish funeral directors
Hurling selectors
Kilkenny inter-county hurlers
St Lachtain's hurlers